Aghcheh Kohal-e Zamani (also Romanized as Āghcheh Kohal-e Zamānī; also known as Āghjeh Kohal Zamān) is a village in Ujan-e Sharqi Rural District, Tekmeh Dash District, Bostanabad County, East Azerbaijan Province, Iran. At the 2006 census, its population was 119, in 22 families.

References 

Populated places in Bostanabad County